Tadabbur-i-Qur'an is a exegeses (tafsir) of the Qur'an by Amin Ahsan Islahi based on the concept of thematic and structural coherence, which was originally inspired by Allama Hamiduddin Farahi. The tafsir is extended over nine volumes of six thousand pages. It was originally written in Urdu, but now it is being translated in English. And it is translated in Tamil by Abdur Rahman Umari.

Contents
It expounds each surah as a coherent discourse, arranging surahs into pairs, and establishing seven major surah divisions – the entire Qur'an thus emerges as a well-connected and systematic book.

Each division has a distinct theme. Topics within a division are more or less in the order of revelation. Within each division, each member of the pair complements the other in various ways. The seven divisions are as follows:

Response to Orientalists
For quite some time, there was a theory that there is no coherence in Qurān. It was asserted that Qurān is a collection of different verses having no logical connection with each other. In the late 19th and early 20th century Western scholars propounded the theory and some of them proposed chronological order on the basis of which the Qurān should be rearranged. On the other hand, Qurān has the most important place in the Muslim community. They derive all religious guidance and aspirations from the Qurān.

Orientalists assert that Qurān does not even fulfil the characteristics of a book. How can it be claimed to be the best of all the books? Tadabbur-i-Qurān is conceived to an answer to the challenge that the Qurān is not a coherent book. Islahi wrote his magnum opus, on the principles derived from his teacher, Farahi, who address the issue in the beginning of 20th century. Islahi started his work on this project at the beginning of his career and completed it in 1980. The work upholds that Qurān is not a haphazardly arranged book, but that there is a structural and thematic coherence in the Qurān. The arrangement of the Qurān is divine and rational. Islahi divided the whole Quran in seven groups named Amud (central theme). Each section is revolving around a particular theme.
Each sura is carrying a theme and connected with the adjacent sura as pair. Each is complementing the other by different ways with the exception of sura Fatiha.

Influence
The concept of nazm in Qurān adopted by Islahi in his exegesis led him to interpret Qurān in many places different from the other Ulama. Another characteristic of Tadabbur-i-Qurān is specification of the addresses of the text. This is important to determine implication of the tenets of Qurān upon the Muslims. Tadabbur-i-Qurān is influencing Islamīc literature more than any other Qurānic exegetical work in modern times. No future scholar undertaking interpretation and exposition of Qurān or working on Islamīc themes can afford to ignore this monumental exegetical work of Islahi.

See also
 List of Sunni books

External links
 Salaam – Tafsir based on Tadabbur-i-Qur'an
 Tadabbur-i-Qur'an

References
Footnote citations

Bibliography
 
 Khalid Masud: Quran e Hakim, An Abridged version of Tadabbur e Quran in one volume
 
 
 

Sunni tafsir